Hersleb is a surname. Notable people with the surname include:

Christian Hersleb Horneman (1781–1860), Norwegian jurist and politician
Hersleb Vogt (1912–1999), Norwegian diplomat
Jacob Hersleb Darre (1757–1841), Norwegian vicar
Peder Christian Hersleb Kjerschow (1786–1866), Norwegian clergyman
Peder Hersleb (1689–1757), Norwegian-Danish bishop
Peter Hersleb Classen (1738–1825), Norwegian-Danish statesman
Peter Hersleb Graah Birkeland (1807–1896), Norwegian bishop
Peter Hersleb Harboe Castberg (1794–1858), Norwegian priest and politician
Svend Borchmann Hersleb (1784–1836), Norwegian professor of theology who also served one term in the Norwegian Parliament
Svend Borchmann Hersleb Vogt (1852–1923), Norwegian jurist and politician for the Conservative Party